The 1978 NCAA Division I Men's Lacrosse Tournament was the 8th annual Division I NCAA Men's Lacrosse Championship tournament. Twelve NCAA Division I college men's lacrosse teams met after having played their way through a regular season, and for some, a conference tournament.

Tournament overview
The championship game was hosted by Rutgers University, and was played in front of 13,527 fans. The game saw the Johns Hopkins University defeat Cornell University by the score of 13–8, using a three-goal performance by midfielder Bob DeSimone.

The finals was a showdown of the Number 1 and Number 2 ranked teams, with Johns Hopkins lone loss coming on April 15 to Cornell 16-11 at Homewood Field in Baltimore.

The finals was notable also as Cornell had come into the game on a 42-game unbeaten streak. Cornell had not lost a game since May 24, 1975, a 15-12 setback to Navy in the 1975 NCAA tournament semifinals. Cornell set the NCAA consecutive victories record of 42 games, not losing a game from March 20, 1976, to May 20, 1978. During this win streak, Cornell was 16 and 0 in 1976, 13 and 0 in 1977 and 13 and 1 in 1978. This was the first game since 1975 in which Cornell had been limited to less than 10 goals.

Mike O'Neill, attackman from Johns Hopkins, was later named the Division 1 National Player of the Year and was named the tournament outstanding player, finishing with one goal and three assists in the finals. Johns Hopkins would go on to win three straight national titles and appear in an unprecedented nine straight NCAA finals, from 1977 through 1985, finishing with five national titles against four losses during that stretch. Ned Radebaugh dominated at face off winning 20 of 22 draws, with Radebaugh's dominance contributing to the NCAA's decision for the 1979 season to eliminate faceoffs.

Tournament results

Tournament boxscores

Tournament Finals

Tournament Semi-Finals

Tournament Quarterfinals

Tournament outstanding players

 Mike O’Neill, Johns Hopkins, tournament Most Outstanding Player

References

External links 
1978 Championship Game at YouTube
Hopkins Stuns Cornell in Lax Final Harvard Crimson May 31, 1978

NCAA Division I Men's Lacrosse Championship
NCAA Division I Men's Lacrosse Championship
NCAA Division I Men's Lacrosse Championship
NCAA Division I Men's Lacrosse Championship
NCAA Division I Men's Lacrosse Championship